Rebel: Thief Who Stole the People is a South Korean television series starring Yoon Kyun-sang, Chae Soo-bin, Kim Ji-seok, Lee Hanee, and Kim Sang-joong. It aired on MBC every Monday and Tuesday at 22:00 (KST) from January 30, 2017 to May 16, 2017.

The series was a success with average viewership ratings of 11.34%, and was praised by both critics and audiences for its plot and performances.

Synopsis
Set during the reign of famous tyrant King Yeonsangun, it tells the story of Hong Gil-dong, the son of a servant who stole from the rich and gave to the poor, and his journey in becoming Joseon's first revolutionary activist.

Hong Gil Dong (Yoon Kyun-sang) is the son of servant Hong Ah Mo Gae, which gives Gil Dong no legal standing in Joseon society. With no opportunities to do any legitimate work despite his brilliance, Gil Dong becomes the leader of a band of smugglers who steals from the rich to give to the poor. Gil Dong's contemporary, Yi Yung, becomes the tyrannical King Yeonsangun (Kim Ji-seok) who oppresses the lives of the common people. The king's faithful consort is Jang Nok-su (Lee Hanee), who secretly can't forget her first love, Gil Dong.

Cast

Main
 Yoon Kyun-sang as Hong Gil-dong
 Lee Ro-woon as young Hong Gil-dong
 Chae Soo-bin as Song Ga-ryung 
Gil-dong's love interest and later wife.
Vehid Abdullahi as Depp Kj Paman
Kim Sang-joong as Hong Ah Mo-gae 
Gil-dong's father. A brilliant and ambitious slave who frees himself and later becomes the leader of the Ilkhwari.
 Kim Ji-suk as Crown Prince Lee Yoong (later King Yeonsan)
 Lee Hanee as Gong-hwa (later renamed to Jang Nok-soo) 
Yeonsangun's consort and Gil-dong's first love.

Supporting

Hong Family
Shim Hee-sub as Hong Gil-hyun / Park Ha-sung
Lee Do-hyun as young Hong Gil-hyun
Mo-gae's eldest son and Gil-dong's older brother.
Shin Eun-jung as Geum-ok
Ah Mo Gae's wife and Gil-dong's mother.
Lee Soo-min as Hong Uh Ri-ni / Sang-hwa
Jeong Soo-in as young Hong Uh Ri-ni 
Mo-gae's youngest daughter and Gil-dong's younger sister.

Ilkhwari
Park Jun-gyu as Hong So Boo-ri
 Lee Jun-hyeok as Hong Yong-gae
Kim Do-yoon as Hong Se-gul
Heo Jung-do as Hong Il-chung
Lee Ho-chul as Hong Kkeut-shwe
Kim Byung-chun as Soo Noh Man-sub 
Lee Myung-hoon as Hong Eob-san
Jo Hyun-do as young Eob-san
Kim Ha-eun as Jeok Sun-ah

Royal Court
Kim Jung-tae as Prince Choongwongun / Lee Jung
Choi Moo-sung as King Seongjong
Park Soo-young as Kim Ja-won
Ahn Suk-hwan as First Vice-Premier Noh Sa-shin
Ryu Tae-ho as Ryu Ja-gwang
Choi Yong-min as Yoon Pil-sang
Park Ji-il as Lee Se-jwa
Choi Dae-chul as Park Won-jong

Others
Kim Byeong-ok as Magistrate Uhm Ja-chi
A third-generation magistrate secretary. He later becomes a town magistrate with the help of Mo-gae.
Hwang Seok-jeong as Wol Ha-mae
Kim Joon-bae as Heo Tae-hak
A thug and Ah Mo-gae's rival.
Kim Jung-hyun as Mo Ri
Heo Tae-hak's right-hand man, later a rival of Gil-dong
Ahn Nae-sang as Song Do-hwan
Seo Yi-sook as Lady Jo, Jo Cham-bong's wife.
Park Eun-seok as Jo Soo-hak, Jo Cham-bong's son.
Kim Ye-jun as young Jo Soo-hak
Song Sam-dong as Lee Uk-gong
Jung Da-bin as Ok Ran
Lee Do-gyeom as Do-ho
Park Ji-a as Jin-soo	
Lee Chung-mi as Han-deok	
Kim Hee-jung as Baek Kyun
Kang Hui as Yeong-hui
 Cha Geon-woo
 Shim Eun-woo as a Shaman

Special appearances
Son Jong-hak as Lord Jo Cham-bong
Ko In-bum as Lord Jo's uncle
 Moon Sook

Production
Actors Nam Goong Min and Ji Sung were first offered the lead role but later got replaced by Yoon Kyun-sang.
The first script reading took place on 30 December 2016 at MBC Broadcasting Station in Sangam.
The drama reunited Yoon Kyun-sang and Chae Soo-bin after both starred in the Uniqnote feat. Bobby Kim and Jung Yup for Girlfriend in 2014

Ratings 
In the table below, the blue numbers represent the lowest ratings and the red numbers represent the highest ratings.
NR denotes that the drama did not rank in the top 20 daily programs on that date

Episode 28 did not air on May 2 due to the broadcast of a presidential debate.
Episode 29 did not air on May 9 due to news coverage of the presidential election.

Original soundtrack

Part 1

Part 2

Part 3

Part 4

Part 5

Part 6

Part 7

Part 8

Part 9

Part 10

International broadcast
 The series is available worldwide on DramaFever since January 31, 2017 under the title Rebel: Thief of the People.
 In the Philippines and Singapore, the series is streamed on Viu 12 hours after the South Korean broadcast, under the title The Rebel.
 In Indonesia, Hong Kong, Malaysia and Singapore, the series is being broadcast on Oh!K within 24 hours after the South Korean broadcast, under the title The Rebel.
 In Japan, the series will be broadcast on KNTV every Wednesday and Thursday at 10:05 JST starting April 19, 2017 under the title .
The series was available on Netflix

Awards and nominations

References

External links
 
 

Korean-language television shows
MBC TV television dramas
South Korean historical television series
Television series set in the Joseon dynasty
Works based on Hong Gildong jeon
2017 South Korean television series debuts
2017 South Korean television series endings